Bucey may refer to several communes in France:
 Bucey-en-Othe, in the Aube department
 Bucey-lès-Gy, in the Haute-Saône department
 Bucey-lès-Traves, in the Haute-Saône department